Jindřich Trpišovský (born 27 February 1976) is a Czech football manager who is currently the manager of Slavia Prague.

Playing career
During his playing career, Trpišovský played for Čechie Karlín as a goalkeeper. At the age of 12, Trpišovský was discouraged from playing football due to knee problems, before returning to the sport at the age of 17.

Management career
At the age of 20, Trpišovský began coaching at Čechie Karlín's youth teams, combining coaching with working at the Esplanade Hotel in Prague. Trpišovský later joined Bohemians 1905 and Sparta Prague as a youth coach, before joining Xaverov as an assistant.

In 2011, Trpišovský was named as manager of SK Horní Měcholupy. At the same time, Trpišovský was working at Czech Second League side Viktoria Žižkov as assistant, due to Žižkov being Horní Měcholupy's parent club. In 2013, Trpišovský became manager of Žižkov.

In July 2015, Trpišovský was named as the new manager of Slovan Liberec after David Vavruška's departure to Teplice. During his time at Liberec, Trpišovský guided the club to the UEFA Europa League group stages twice, finishing third in 2015–16 in a group containing Braga, Groningen and Marseille.

On 22 December 2017, Trpišovský signed a contract with Slavia Prague. At the end of Trpišovský's first season at Slavia, the club won the Czech Cup. The following season, Slavia won the league and cup double, as well as reaching the quarter-finals of the Europa League. Slavia reached the group stages of the UEFA Champions League in the 2019–20 season, as well as winning the Czech First League for the second time under Trpišovský's tenure. In 2021, Slavia once again won the league and cup double, their third consecutive league title under Trpišovský's management, as well as reaching the quarter-finals of the Europa League, knocking out Leicester City and Rangers along the way.

Honours

Managerial
 SK Slavia Prague
Czech First League: 2018–19, 2019–20, 2020–21
Czech Cup:  2017–18, 2018–19, 2020–21
Czechoslovak Supercup: 2019

Managerial statistics

References

1976 births
Living people
Footballers from Prague
Czech footballers
Association football goalkeepers
Czech football managers
Czech First League managers
Association football coaches
FC Slovan Liberec managers
SK Slavia Prague managers
FK Viktoria Žižkov managers
Czech National Football League managers